The Champawat Tiger was a  Bengal Tigress responsible for an estimated 436 deaths in Nepal and the Kumaon division of India, during the last years of the 19th century and the first years of the 20th century. Her attacks have been listed in the Guinness Book of World Records as the highest number of fatalities from a tiger (as well as any animal). She was shot and killed in 1907 by a then 31-year-old Jim Corbett.

History

According to Peter Byrne, professional hunter and author from Nepal, the tiger began her attacks in a Rupal village in western Nepal, Himalayas. Hunters were sent in to kill the tiger, but she managed to evade them. Eventually, the Nepalese Army was called in. Despite failing to capture or kill the tiger, soldiers organised a massive beat and managed to force the tiger to abandon her territory and drive her across the border (river Sarda) into India, where she continued her killing activities in the Kumaon District.

Her behaviour became more like a Siberian tiger in her habits and she created a larger territory to encompass multiple villages in the Kumaon area, with Champawat being close to the centre of her territory. Most of her victims were young women and children, who often went into the forest to collect firewood, feed livestock, and gather resources for craft work.

All her kills happened in daylight (Corbett said he was not aware of a single case of a tiger killing a human during the night). Life across the region was paralysed, with men often refusing to leave their huts for work after hearing the tiger's roars from the forest.

In 1907, the tiger was killed by British hunter Jim Corbett. The tiger had killed a 16-year-old girl, Premka Devi, in the village of Fungar, near to the town of Champawat, and left a trail of blood, which Corbett followed. After nearly getting ambushed by the tiger while investigating the remains of its victim and scaring her off with two shots from his rifle, Corbett had to abandon the hunt, deciding to use villagers and to organise a beat the next day in the Champa River gorge.

With the help of the tehsildar of Champawat, the beat was organised with about 300 villagers, and the next day, about noon, Corbett shot the tigress dead. Corbett's first shots hit the tigress in the chest and shoulder, and his last shot, made with the tehsildar's rifle to keep it from charging him after he ran out of bullets, hit her in the foot, causing it to collapse  from him.

A postmortem on the tigress showed the upper and lower canine teeth on the right side of her mouth were broken, the upper one in half, the lower one right down to the bone. This injury, a result of an old gunshot, according to Corbett, probably prevented her from hunting her natural prey, and hence, she started to hunt humans. Further examinations made by Corbett during his hunt for the tiger indicated that she was in healthy condition physically (other than her teeth) and was between 10 and 12 years old.

"After bringing down the Champawat Tiger, Jim Corbett acquired a reputation as the leading hunter of man-eaters. This ability served him well, at a time when deforestation and diminishing prey were driving more and more tigers and leopards to hunt humans for food."

Champawat town
In Champawat, near the Chataar Bridge and on the way to Lohaghat, there is a "cement board" marking the place where the tigress was finally brought down. The details about the Champawat Tigress and how she was brought down can be found in the book Maneaters of Kumaon (1944), written by Corbett himself.

In popular culture
The video game Guild Wars 2, features a tiger-themed legendary weapon and accompanying quest series named "Chuka and Champawat".

See also
 Bachelor of Powalgarh
 Tiger attack
 Gaver Tigers (man-eating tigers of Nepal)

References

Further reading
 
 
 
 
 

Champawat Tiger
Champawat Tiger
Champawat
Champawat
1907 animal deaths
Man-eaters of India
Individual wild animals
World record holders
Tigers in Nepal
Individual animals in Nepal